Clarence Joseph Morley (February 9, 1869 – November 15, 1948) was the 24th Governor of Colorado from 1925 to 1927, serving one two-year term. He was a Republican. Before becoming governor he was a judge in Denver, Colorado. He was a member of the Ku Klux Klan which was an important force in Colorado politics during the 1920s and largely responsible for the division of the Republican and Democratic votes that enabled him to take office.

Tenure as governor
Morely took office on January 16, 1925, in a ceremony at the Municipal Auditorium in Denver.

Virulently anti-Catholic, Morley was one of the most extreme governors in Colorado history. The Center for Colorado & the West at the Auraria Library wrote:

Morely's administration was marked by "scandals and ineptitude."

Mail fraud conviction
After leaving office, Morley established C.J. Morley & Company, a stock brokerage firm in Indianapolis, Indiana.  In 1935, Morley was arrested on charges from mail fraud; he was convicted for 21 counts of mail fraud and using political influences to defraud customers. Sentenced to five years in Leavenworth Prison, he died three years after being released. He is buried in Denver at Fairmount Cemetery.

References

External links

1869 births
1948 deaths
People from Dyersville, Iowa
American prisoners and detainees
Republican Party governors of Colorado
American Ku Klux Klan members
American politicians convicted of fraud
Politicians from Oklahoma City
Critics of the Catholic Church
Colorado politicians convicted of crimes